Donald Sutherland Bain (March 6, 1935 – October 21, 2017) was an American author and ghostwriter, having written over 115 books in his 40-year career.

Bibliography

The Coffee, Tea or Me? series
byline: Trudy Baker and Rachel Jones
Coffee, Tea or Me? (1967)
The Coffee Tea or Me Girls’ Round-the-World Diary (1970)
The Coffee Tea or Me Girls Lay It on the Line (1972)
The Coffee Tea or Me Girls Get Away From it All (1974)

The Murder, She Wrote series

byline: Jessica Fletcher and Donald Bain

A spin-off book series based on the Murder, She Wrote American crime drama television series starring Angela Lansbury as mystery writer and amateur detective Jessica Fletcher.

Gin and Daggers (1st edition) (1989)
Manhattans and Murder (1994)
Rum and Razors (1995)
Brandy and Bullets (1995)
Martinis and Mayhem (1995)
A Deadly Judgment (1996)
A Palette for Murder (1996)
The Highland Fling Murders (1997)
Murder on the QE2 (1997)
Murder in Moscow (1998)
A Little Yuletide Murder (1998)
Murder at the Powderhorn Ranch (1999)
Knock 'em Dead (1999)
Gin and Daggers (2nd edition) (2000)
Trick or Treachery (2000)
Blood on the Vine (2001)
Murder in a Minor Key (2001)
Provence - to Die for (2002)
You Bet Your Life (2002)
 Majoring in Murder (2003)
Destination Murder (2003)
Dying to Retire (2004)
A Vote for Murder (2004)
The Maine Mutiny (2005)

Margaritas and Murder (2005)
A Question of Murder (2006)
Three Strikes and You're Dead (2006)
Coffee, Tea, or Murder? (2007)
Panning For Murder (2007)
Murder on Parade (2008)
A Slaying in Savannah (2008)
Madison Avenue Shoot (2009)
A Fatal Feast (2009)
Nashville Noir (2010)
The Queen's Jewels (2010)
Skating on Thin Ice (2011)
The Fine Art of Murder (2011)
Trouble at High Tide (2012)
Domestic Malice (2012)
Prescription For Murder (2013)
Close-Up On Murder (2013)
Aloha Betrayed (2014)
Death of a Blue Blood (2014)
Killer in the Kitchen (2015)
The Ghost and Mrs. Fletcher (2015)
Design for Murder (2016)
Hook, Line, and Murder (2016)
A Date with Murder (2018) written with Jon Land

Comedic novels
Tender Loving Care – byline: Joni Moura & Jackie Sutherland (1969)
Girlpower – byline: Kathy Cole & Donna Bain (1971)
How to Make a Good Airline Stewardess – byline: Cornelius Wohl & Bill Wenzel (1972)
If It Moves, Kiss It – byline: Joni Moura & Jackie Sutherland (1973)
We Gave at the Office – byline: Laura Mills & Pauline Burlick (1977)
Fly Me - byline: Cornelius Wohl & Bill Wenzel (1974)
Teachers Pet – byline: Janet McMillan & Mitzi Sims (1975)
The Casting Couch and Me – byline: Joan Wood (1975)
Wall Street & Broad – byline: Teri Palmer (1976)

The J.D. Hardin western series
byline: J.D. Hardin
Bloody Sands
The Spirit & the Flesh
Death Flotilla
The Lone Star Massacre
Raider’s Revenge
Raider’s Hell
Apache Gold
Bibles, Bullets & Brides
Death Lode

Other novels
The Airport Affair (1975) – byline: David Toma & Jack Pearl
The Affair of the Unhappy Hooker (1976) – byline: David Toma & Jack Pearl
Sado Cop (1976) – byline: Nick Vasile
A Member of the Family (1993) – byline: Nick Vasile
Raven (1987) – byline: Mike Lundy
Baby Farm (1987) – byline: Mike Lundy
Daughter of the Sand (1978) – byline: Pamela South
The Eagle & the Serpent (1982) – byline: Lee Jackson
Texas Lily (1987) – byline: Stephanie Blake

Biographies and autobiographies
Murder HE Wrote: A Successful Writer's Life (2006) (Autobiography)

Other books
The Racing Flag (1965) – byline: Bloys Britt & Bill France
Veronica (1969) – byline: Veronica Lake (her autobiography, whose ghostwriter he was)
The Case Against Private Aviation (1969) – byline: Donald Bain
Long John Nebel (1974) – byline: Donald Bain
The Control of Candy Jones (1976) – byline: Donald Bain
Club Tropique (1978) – byline: Donald Bain
War in Illinois (1978) – byline: Donald Bain
Charlie & the Shawneetown Dame (2004) – byline: Donald Bain
Caviar, Caviar, Caviar (1981) – byline: Gerald M. Stein & Donald Bain
The "Girls" in the Newsroom (1983) – byline: Marjorie Margolies
The World’s Best Bartenders’ Guide (1998)– byline: Joseph Scott & Donald Bain
Margaret Truman's Experiment in Murder (2012)
Margaret Truman's Undiplomatic Murder (2014)
Margaret Truman's Internship In Murder (2015)
Margaret Truman's Deadly Medicine (2016)
Margaret Truman's Allied in Danger (2017)

Unacknowledged books
A ghostwriter is often required to be anonymous as a part of the contract to write the book. Some sources claim Bain is the author of most of the mystery novels attributed to Margaret Truman. While Bain initially denied this, he wrote a column in the March 14, 2014 issue of Publishers Weekly and finally acknowledged writing "27 novels in the Margaret Truman Capital Crimes series (mostly bylined by Truman, my close collaboratormy name is on only the most recent entries, released after her death)."

See also
United States novelists
American literature

References

External links
Donald Bain on New American Library

1935 births
2017 deaths
American male biographers
American mystery writers
American male novelists
Ghostwriters
20th-century American novelists
20th-century American male writers
21st-century American novelists
20th-century American biographers
21st-century American male writers
21st-century American non-fiction writers